Torngarsoak Mountain is a mountain located  east of Tallek Lake, Labrador, Canada. It is the second highest mountain in Labrador and lies in the Selamiut Range, which is a subrange of the Torngat Mountains.

References

Labrador
One-thousanders of Newfoundland and Labrador